Laurent Évrard (born 22 September 1990) is a Belgian cyclist, who currently rides for French amateur team VC Amateur Saint-Quentin.

Major results

2012
 10th Paris–Tours Espoirs
 10th Circuit de Wallonie
2013
 3rd Overall Tour of Szeklerland
 6th Grote Prijs Stad Geel
 10th Overall Tour de Wallonie
 10th Ronde van Overijssel
2014
 5th Internationale Wielertrofee Jong Maar Moedig
 6th Tour du Finistère
 8th Overall Tour de Luxembourg
 8th Overall Le Triptyque des Monts et Châteaux
 9th Overall Circuit des Ardennes
 10th Grand Prix de la Ville de Lillers
2015
 10th Velothon Wales
2016
 4th Omloop Het Nieuwsblad Beloften
 8th Cholet-Pays de Loire
 9th ZODC Zuidenveld Tour
2018
 1st  Overall Tour International de la Wilaya d'Oran
1st  Points classification
1st  Mountains classification
1st Stage 1
2019
 1st  Overall Tour du Maroc
1st Stage 3

References

External links

1990 births
Living people
Belgian male cyclists
People from Beauvechain
Cyclists from Walloon Brabant
21st-century Belgian people